Hamilton Heights High School was founded in 1965 with the consolidation of Jackson Central Eagles (1943–1965) and the Walnut Grove Wolves (1906–65). Jackson Central was itself formed from the consolidation of the Arcadia Dragons (1906–43), the Atlanta Cardinals (1906–07, 1908–43), and the Cicero Red Devils (1905–12, 1913–43).

(HHHS) is a fully accredited public high school in the Hamilton Heights School Corporation that serves grades 9-12 in the rural northern part of Hamilton County, Indiana. The current principal is Jarrod Mason; the current vice-principal is Whitney Gray.

Figures
For the 2008-09 school year, 733 students were enrolled in grades 9-12, including 374 females and 359 males. In 2008, 84.1% of seniors graduated; 27.2% of seniors graduated with honors. 81% of all graduates reported an intention to pursue a college education.

HHHS participates in the statewide standardized testing regimen known as ISTEP. Of all students tested in the 2008-09 school year, 80.4% of students passed both the English/Language Arts and Mathematics portions of the test, compared to the state average of 73.6%.

For 2007-08, the average score of college-bound juniors taking the PSAT was 141.3, compared to the state average of 136.5. The average composite SAT score of college-bound seniors for 2007-08 was 1020, compared to the state average of 1004. For the same period, the average composite ACT score was 22.3, compared to the state average of 20.0. Also, for the same period, five percent of students took Advanced Placement tests, compared to the state average of 14%.

Also according to the Indiana Department of Education school profile, in 2008-09, the average teacher age was 44.5 years with an average of 17.3 years of teaching experience. The average teacher salary was $49,738. The student:teacher ratio was 18.3:1.

Curriculum
HHHS operates on a traditional schedule, and is divided into the Agriculture, Industrial Education, Science, Business Technology, Fine Arts, Mathematics, Social Studies, Band, English, Foreign Language, Physical Education and Health, Special Education, Athletics, School to College Program, School to Work Program, and Media Center departments. Currently, the Foreign Language department offers instruction in French and Spanish.

Band has been made a popular activity by students at HHHS. Reportedly, of the 714 students enrolled at the school in 2007-08, 100 students participated in the marching band, concert band, pep band, and color guard.

According to the DOE, the Fine Arts department has budgeted for classes in Ceramics, Drawing, Chorus, Dance Performance, and Music Theory and Composition for the 2008-09 school year.

Athletics
HHHS is a division 3A school that supports 19 sports which offer 29 teams to more than 400 students that participate in more than 400 contests annually. The school mascot is the  Husky Victor-e. The school colors are orange, white, and brown.

The school competes against neighboring schools in the Mid Indiana Conference. Currently, programs for men include football, soccer, cross country, tennis, basketball, swimming and diving, wrestling, baseball, golf, and track and field. Programs for women include volleyball, soccer, cross country, golf, basketball, swimming and diving, cheerleading, softball, tennis, and track and field.

Each year the school's football program battles Tipton High School for "The Hammer" traveling trophy.

Notable students
Ryan White
Chris Faulkner, Former Professional Football Player (1984-1985)
Doug Mitchell, Butler Basketball, North Central High School Basketball coach with 2 State Championship teams 1999 and 2010
Gus Etchison
Sterling Weatherford 
A two star recruit in college, who play football for the Miami RedHawks, was drafted by the Colts, and then currently plays in the NFL for the Chicago Bears

See also
 List of high schools in Indiana

References

External links
 Official website
 Hamilton Heights School Corporation
 

Public high schools in Indiana
Schools in Hamilton County, Indiana
1965 establishments in Indiana